Leonore may refer to:

 Leonore (given name), a list of people with the name
 The title character, and original title, of Beethoven's opera Fidelio
Léonore, ou L’amour conjugal, a 1798 opera by Pierre Gaveaux
 Leonore, Illinois, a village in the United States
 Base Léonore, a database of recipients of France's National Order of the Legion of Honor

See also 
 Leonor, a given name
 Léonor, a 1975 horror film
 JB Leonor, Filipino drummer and songwriter born Domingo Leonor III
 Leonora (disambiguation)
 Lenore (disambiguation)